Nathan Larson may refer to:
Nathan Larson (musician), American musician
Nathan Larson (criminal), American white supremacist and convicted felon

See also
Nate Larson, American artist and photographer